Kibungo is a town in the Republic of Rwanda. It is the political, administrative and commercial capital of Ngoma District. In 1998, Kibungo became the site of at least four of Rwanda's last 22 executions. All of the convicts were executed for crimes related to the 1994 genocide.

Location
Kibungo is located in Ngoma District, Eastern Province. Its location lies in the southeastern part of Rwanda, along the main road (B3) from Kigali in Rwanda, to Nyakasanza, in Tanzania.

Population
, the population of Kibungo is estimated at 46,240.

Places of interest
 The offices of Ngoma District Administration
 The offices of Kibungo City Council
 Kibungo Central Market
 Ngoma Prison
 A branch of Bank of Kigali, the largest commercial bank in the country
 A branch of Urwego Opportunity Bank, a commercial bank
 A branch of Banque Populaire du Rwanda, a commercial bank
 The main campus of the Institute of Agriculture, Technology and Education of Kibungo (INATEK), is located in town
 The Open University of Tanzania maintains an office in Kibungo
 Kibungo Referral Hospital

See also
 Ngoma District
 List of universities in Rwanda
 Eastern Province, Rwanda

References

External links

 
Eastern Province, Rwanda